Geneviève de Brunelle, Marquise de Combray (1742–1823), was a French counter-revolutionary and royalist during the French Revolution and the first empire.

Alongside D'Ache, she was the leader of the royalist Chouannerie in Normandy, both during the French revolution and during the reign of Napoleon I.

In 1808, she was sentenced to pillory and 25 years imprisonment. She was freed by the Bourbon Restoration in 1814.

She has been pointed out as the role model of Madame de La Chanterie in dans L'Envers de l'histoire contemporaine by Honoré de Balzac.

References
 Pierre Larousse, "Grand dictionnaire historique du XIXe siècle", 1866-1877
 G. Lenotre, "La Chouannerie normande au temps de l'Empire, Tournebut : 1804-1809" (préface de Victorien Sardou de l'Académie française, Perrin, 1895)
 Ernest Daudet, "Le Temps"
 Mercure de France : série moderne, 1901

1742 births
1823 deaths
People of the French Revolution
Women in 18th-century warfare
Women in war in France